The AF-S DX Zoom-Nikkor 12-24mm 4G is a lens manufactured by Nikon for use on Nikon DX format digital SLR cameras. It provides an angle of view on a DX format camera similar to that of an 18-35mm lens on a 135 film format camera.

Introduction 

Nikon announced the lens on 18 February 2003 as the first lens specifically designed for the Nikon DX format.

This lens was replaced by the AF-S DX NIKKOR 10-24mm f/3.5-4.5G ED announced on April 14, 2009.

Target market 

At the time the lens was introduced, Nikon did not make a zoom lens which would provide an ultra-wide-angle view on a DX format camera. Due to the crop factor of the DX format, wide-angle zoom lenses such as the 18-35mm provided an angle of view equivalent to a 27-52.5mm lens; more typical of a normal zoom.

The purpose of the 12-24mm was to fill this gap in the ultra-wide- to wide-angle range that would otherwise require users to purchase relatively expensive prime lenses such as the 13mm, 15mm and 18mm Nikkors.

Features 

 12-24mm focal length (approximately equivalent to an 18-35mm lens used on a 135 film format camera)
 Compact silent-wave autofocus motor with full-time manual override
 Nikon F-mount lens exclusively for use with Nikon DX format DSLRs
 Extra-low Dispersion (ED) glass elements to reduce chromatic aberration
 Aspherical elements to reduce distortion
 Super integrated coating (SIC) to reduce flare and ghosts
 Internal focusing (IF)

Construction 

 eleven lens elements in seven groups
 three aspherical elements
 two ED glass elements

See also
List of Nikon compatible lenses with integrated autofocus-motor

References 

Camera lenses introduced in 2003
Nikon F-mount lenses